The 2015–2016 Israel Football League season was the ninth season of the Israel Football League (IFL) and concluded with the Judean Rebels defeating the Tel Aviv Pioneers, 32-14, in Israel Bowl IX.

Regular season 
The regular season began on November 6, 2015 and consisted of a ten game schedule, with the Judean Rebels earning the top seed for the playoffs.

Playoffs 

In the quarterfinals, the Underdogs defeated the Hammers while the Pioneers defeated the Black Swarm. In the semifinals, the Rebels defeated the Underdogs and the Pioneers upset the Lions to set up a rematch of Israel Bowl VIII. In Israel Bowl IX, the Rebels defeated the Pioneers to win their second consecutive championship. Dani Eastman was named Israel Bowl MVP.  

  * Indicates overtime victory

Awards 
Most Valuable Player: David Abell, QB, Jerusalem Lions

References 

Israel Football League Seasons